Ericea or Erikeia was a deme of ancient Attica, located near the modern Kypseli. The name of the deme probably derives from the erica plant, which grew abundantly in the hilly territory of the area.

References

Populated places in ancient Attica
Former populated places in Greece
Demoi